The 14th Seiyu Awards (声優アワード) were announced on March 7, 2020 by Nippon Cultural Broadcasting. The winners of the Merit Awards, the Kei Tomiyama Award, and the Kazue Takahashi Award, were announced on 18 February 2020. The ceremony was originally scheduled to be held at the Bunka Housou Media Plus Hall, but was cancelled during COVID-19 pandemic. The results were instead announced on the Chou! A&G radio program.

Award winners

References

Seiyu Awards ceremonies
2020 film awards
2019 television awards
March 2020 events in Japan
2020 in Japanese cinema
2020 in Japanese television
Seiyu Awards
Seiyu Awards
Cancelled film events
Cancelled television events